Neoromanticism in music is a return (at any of several points in the nineteenth or twentieth centuries) to the emotional expression associated with nineteenth-century Romanticism. A part of Neo-romanticism.

Definitions
Neoromanticism was a term that originated in literary theory in the early 19th century to distinguish later kinds of romanticism from earlier manifestations. In music, it was first used by Richard Wagner in his polemical 1851 article "Oper und Drama", as a disparaging term for the French romanticism of Hector Berlioz and Giacomo Meyerbeer from 1830 onwards, which he regarded as a degenerated form of true romanticism. The word came to be used by historians of ideas to refer to music from 1850 onwards, and to the work of Wagner in particular. The designation "neo" was used to acknowledge the fact that music of the second half of the 19th century remained in a romantic mode in an unromantic age, dominated by positivism, when literature and painting had moved on to realism and impressionism .

According to Daniel Albright, In the late twentieth century, the term Neoromanticism came to suggest a music that imitated the high emotional saturation of the music of (for example) Schumann [ Romanticism ], but in the 1920s it meant a subdued and modest sort of emotionalism, in which the excessive gestures of the Expressionists were boiled down into some solid residue of stable feeling.  Thus, in Albright's view, neoromanticism in the 1920s was not a return to romanticism but, on the contrary, a tempering of an overheated post-romanticism.

Notable composers
In this sense, Virgil Thomson proclaimed himself to be "most easily-labeled practitioner [of Neo-Romanticism] in America," :
Neo-Romanticism involves rounded melodic material (the neo-Classicists affected angular themes) and the frank expression of personal sentiments. . . . That position is an esthetic one purely, because technically we are eclectic. Our contribution to contemporary esthetics has been to pose the problems of sincerity in a new way. We are not out to impress, and we dislike inflated emotions. The feelings we really have are the only ones we think worthy of expression. . . . Sentiment is our subject and sometimes landscape, but preferably a landscape with figures.

In the twentieth century, composers such as John Adams, Airat Ichmouratov and Richard Danielpour have been described as neoromantics.

Since the mid-1970s the term has come to be identified with neoconservative postmodernism, especially in Germany, Austria, and the United States, with composers such as Wolfgang Rihm and George Rochberg. Currently active US-based composers widely described as neoromantic include David Del Tredici and Ellen Taaffe Zwilich . Francis Poulenc and Henri Sauguet were French composers considered neoromantic  while Virgil Thomson , Nicolas Nabokov , Howard Hanson and Douglas Moore were American composers considered neoromantic .

See also
Neo-romanticism
Vítězslav Novák
Postmodern music
Romantic music
Neoclassicism (music)

References

Sources

Further reading
Heyman, Barbara B. 2001. "Barber, Samuel." The New Grove Dictionary of Music and Musicians, second edition, edited by Stanley Sadie and John Tyrrell. London: Macmillan Publishers; New York: Grove's Dictionaries of Music.
Lewis, Zachary M. 2003. "Neo This, Neo That: An Attempt to Trace the Origins of Neo-Romanticism". New Music Box (1 September). (Accessed 9 January 2011)
Svatos, Thomas D. 2009. "A Clash over Julietta: The Martinů/Nejedlý Political Conflict and Twentieth-Century Czech Critical Culture". Ex Tempore 14, no. 2:1-41.

External links
Art of the States: neoromantic neoromantic works by American composers
"Neoromanticism", Canadian Music Centre

20th-century classical music
Neo-romanticism